High Voltage  is a double live album by British progressive rock band Emerson, Lake & Palmer, released in 2010.

On 25 July 2010, Emerson, Lake and Palmer played a one-off 40th anniversary concert, headlining the High Voltage Festival event in Victoria Park, London. The entire concert was later released as the double-CD live album "High Voltage". With the deaths of Keith Emerson and Greg Lake in 2016, the High Voltage concert constitutes the final performance of Emerson, Lake and Palmer as a band.

Track listing
Disc 1 

"Karn Evil 9: 1st Impression - Part 2"
"The Barbarian"
"Bitches Crystal"
"Knife-Edge"
"From the Beginning"
"Touch and Go"
"Take a Pebble"
"Tarkus (Eruption/Stones Of Years/Iconoclast/Mass/Battlefield/Aquatarkus)"

Disc 2 
"Farewell to Arms"
"Lucky Man"
"Pictures at an Exhibition medley"
"Promenade"
"The Gnome"
"The Sage"
"The Hut of Baba Yaga"
"The Curse of Baba Yaga" (introduction)
"The Hut of Baba Yaga"
"The Great Gates of Kiev"
"Fanfare for the Common Man/Drum Solo/Rondo"

There seems to be some confusion as to what the album, by this title, is.  There is also another album by ELP by this title that is a compilation of studio tracks.  The track list for the IMPORT studio recording compilation is:

Disc one

 "Tarkus"
 "Pictures at an Exhibition"
 "Nut Rocker"

Disc two

 "Touch and Go"
 "The Barbarian"
 "Fanfare for the Common Man"
 "Lucky Man"
 "Take a Pebble"

Sanctuary/Universal  Item 2743614  UPC: 0602527436142

Personnel

Band members
Keith Emerson - keyboards
Greg Lake - bass, guitars, vocals
Carl Palmer - percussion, drums

External links
High Voltage at Amazon

Emerson, Lake & Palmer live albums
2010 live albums